Fung Tei is an MTR Light Rail stop elevated at Castle Peak Road in Tuen Mun District, near Brilliant Garden. It began service on 2 February 1992 and belongs to Zone 3. It serves Fung Tei and nearby areas.

References

MTR Light Rail stops
Former Kowloon–Canton Railway stations
Fu Tei
Railway stations in Hong Kong opened in 1992
1992 establishments in Hong Kong